Joseph F. Hand (born February 10, 1979) is an American professional racing driver who competes in sports car racing as a Ford factory driver. A former champion of the Star Mazda Series, Hand is the co-winner of the 2011 24 Hours of Daytona driving for Chip Ganassi Racing, the 2012 12 Hours of Sebring GT class for BMW Team Rahal, and the 2016 24 Hours of Le Mans LMGTE Pro class for Ford Chip Ganassi Team USA driving the Ford GT.

Racing career

Early career
Hand began his career in kart racing, starting at the age of 12. Moving up to the Star Mazda Series in 1998, Hand won nine races in the series, winning the rookie of the year award in 1998 and the series championship in 1999.

Following an injury that sidelined him for most of the 2000 season, Hand moved up to the Toyota Atlantic series in 2001, scoring two wins in three years spent in the series, with a best championship finish of third in 2001.

Grand-Am, ALMS and IMSA
Beginning with the 2004 season, Hand has raced in the Grand American Road Racing Association's Rolex Sports Car Series, racing in both the Grand Touring and Daytona Prototype classes, winning five times in the GT category while driving BMWs. Hand has also raced sporadically in the American LeMans Series; in 2006, Hand was involved in a spectacular end-over-end crash at the Mid-Ohio Sports Car Course, while in 2009, he won the first pole position for a BMW in eight years in the ALMS at Road America.

Driving for Chip Ganassi Racing, Hand, along with co-drivers Scott Pruett, Memo Rojas and Graham Rahal, won the 2011 Rolex 24 Hours of Daytona endurance race at Daytona International Speedway, driving the #01 Riley-BMW Daytona Prototype. The team was set back by a pit road penalty while Hand was driving, however, he was able to recover from the penalty for co-driver Pruett to take the car to victory. The following month the BMW Motorsport team he drove for won the GT class of the 2011 12 Hours of Sebring. Later he joined the BMW Motorsport factory team at the 24 Hours of Le Mans, where he finished third in the GTE-Pro class driving again a BMW M3. Also in 2011, Hand competed full-time at the Grand-Am Sports Car Challenge for Turner, resulting in runner-up with Michael Marsal as a teammate.

Hand returned to BMW Rahal for the 2012 American Le mans Series season. He again won the GT class at the 12 Hours of Sebring and took three podiums out of seven appearances. Meanwhile, he resulted sixth overall at the 24 Hours of Daytona driving a Ganassi BMW.

In the 2013 ALMS season, the driver got a second-place class finish and two-fourths out of six appearances for BMW Rahal with a BMW Z4 de Rahal. Again he raced for Ganassi at the 24 Hours of Daytona and later the Brickyard Grand Prix at Indianapolis.

As the new United SportsCar Championship launched in 2014, Hand resulted second in the GTLM class at the 24 Hours of Daytona and third at the 12 Hours of Sebring for BMW Rahal.

In 2016, Hand joined the Ford factory program for the IMSA 2016 WeatherTech SportsCar Championship as well as the 24 Hours of Le Mans. He was reunited with teammate Dirk Müller, while Sébastien Bourdais joined the team for the endurance races including Le Mans. Hand, Müller, and Bourdais went on to win the 2016 24 Hours of Le Mans in the LMGTE Pro category while driving the 2017 Ford GT LME GTE-Pro.

Other racing

On October 22, 2011, Hand made his debut in the International V8 Supercars Championship, driving for Dick Johnson Racing in the Gold Coast 600. finishing 4th with co-driver James Moffat In November, he drove a DTM car for the first time, testing for BMW at Circuito Monteblanco in Spain.

On October 5, 2021, Rick Ware Racing announced that Hand would make his NASCAR debut in the NASCAR Cup Series race at the Charlotte Motor Speedway Roval.

DTM
On December 15, 2011, Hand was announced as one of BMW's factory drivers for the Deutsche Tourenwagen Masters, which saw him compete in the entire 2012 championship, alongside a limited-season American Le Mans Series campaign with BMW Team RLL.  He was the first American to have a full-season factory contract in the series since its inception in 1984. In three seasons he had a best race result of 5th at Brand Hatch and a best season result of 12th, both in 2013.

Personal life
Born in Sacramento, California, Hand and his wife, Natalie, have two children.

Motorsports career results

American open–wheel racing results
(key) (Races in bold indicate pole position) (Races in italics indicate fastest lap)

Atlantic Championship

24 Hours of Le Mans results

Complete DTM results
(key)

Complete IMSA SportsCar Championship results
(key)(Races in bold indicate pole position, Results are overall/class)

NASCAR
(key) (Bold – Pole position awarded by qualifying time. Italics – Pole position earned by points standings or practice time. * – Most laps led.)

Cup Series

References

External links

Joey Hand at Driver Database
Video of the 2006 crash at "And they walked away..."

Living people
1979 births
Racing drivers from Sacramento, California
24 Hours of Le Mans drivers
24 Hours of Daytona drivers
American Le Mans Series drivers
Rolex Sports Car Series drivers
Supercars Championship drivers
Atlantic Championship drivers
Formula BMW USA drivers
Indy Pro 2000 Championship drivers
Deutsche Tourenwagen Masters drivers
Barber Pro Series drivers
WeatherTech SportsCar Championship drivers
International Kart Federation drivers
Chip Ganassi Racing drivers
BMW M drivers
Racing Bart Mampaey drivers
Rahal Letterman Lanigan Racing drivers
Multimatic Motorsports drivers
Starworks Motorsport drivers
Dick Johnson Racing drivers
NASCAR drivers
Meyer Shank Racing drivers
Schnitzer Motorsport drivers
Michelin Pilot Challenge drivers